The Ambassador of the United Kingdom to Angola is the United Kingdom's foremost diplomatic representative in the Republic of Angola, and head of the UK's diplomatic mission in Luanda.

Since 1980 the British ambassador to Angola is also accredited to the Democratic Republic of São Tomé and Príncipe.

Ambassadors
1978–1981: Sir Hugh Campbell Byatt
1981–1983: Sir Francis Kennedy
1983–1985: Sir Marrack Goulding
1985–1987: Sir Patrick Fairweather
1987–1990: James Glaze
1990–1993: John Gerrard Flynn
1993–1995: Anthony Richard Thomas
1995–1998: Roger Dudley Hart
1998–2002: Caroline Elmes
2002–2005: John Thompson
2005–2007: Ralph Publicover
2007–2009: Patricia Phillips
2010–2014: Richard Wildash
2014–2018: John Dennis
2018–2021: Jessica Hand

2021–: Roger Stringer

References

External links
UK and Angola, gov.uk

Angola
 
United Kingdom